Faraar Kab Tak is an Indian crime television show that was aired on Ishara TV. This show stars Atul Kulkarni.

Cast

Hosts 
 Atul Kulkarni

Other roles 
 Sharmila Dey
 Prabhat Maurya
 Rose Laskar

References

External links

Farar Kab Tak on EpicON
Farar Kab tak on Ishara 

2021 Indian television series debuts
Hindi-language television shows
Indian crime television series
2021 Indian television series endings